Steinsundøyna is an island in the municipality of Solund in Vestland county, Norway.  The  sits on the north side of the Sognesjøen, at the mouth of the large Sognefjorden.  The rocky island is virtually treeless (except in small, sheltered areas).  In 2001, there were only about 55 residents on the island.  There is a road that crosses the island, connecting the islands of Ytre Sula (by ferry) and Sula (by bridge).  The largest population centre on Steinsundøyna is the village of Steinsund on the eastern coast of the island, just across the strait from the village of Hardbakke on the island of Sula.

The strait between Steinsundøyna and the neighbouring island to the west, Rånøyna, is called Steinsund. For instance Hurtigruten ships pass that sound on their way from and to Bergen.

See also
List of islands of Norway

References

Islands of Vestland
Solund